Gooseberry Lake Provincial Park  is a provincial park in Alberta, Canada, located  north from Consort and  south from Czar, immediately east of Buffalo Trail.

It was established on November 21, 1932 and is maintained by Alberta Tourism, Parks and Recreation.

Activities
The following activities are available in the park:
Birdwatching (sanderlings, red-necked phalaropes, ducks, geese, swans, gulls, great blue herons, American white pelicans and a small population of the nationally endangered piping plover)
Camping
Fishing

See also
List of provincial parks in Alberta
List of Canadian provincial parks
List of National Parks of Canada

References

External links

Provincial parks of Alberta
Special Area No. 4